Gies is a surname of Germanic origin. It is either a patronymic surname, Gies being a form of the old Germanic name Giso, or a toponymic surname related to the Old High German word Gieze for a small stream. People with this name include:

Frances Gies (1915–2013), American historian, author, and wife of Joseph Gies
Gerd Gies (born 1943), German politician, Minister President of Saxony-Anhalt
Hans-Peter Gies (born 1947), East German shot putter
Heinrich Gies (1912–1973), German film and television actor
Jan Gies (1905–1993), Dutch resistance figure who helped hide Anne Frank
Jeroen Gies (born 1995), German-Dutch football goalkeeper
Joseph Gies (1916–2006), American historian, author, and husband of Frances Gies
Kurt Gies (1921–1943), German tennis player
Ludwig Gies (1887–1966), German sculptor and medallist
Miep Gies (1909–2010), Dutch resistance figure who helped hide Anne Frank
Reiner Gies (born 1963), German boxer who competed in the 1988 Olympics
William John Gies (1872–1956), American biochemist and dentist

As a given name
 (1920–1997), Belgian painter and politician

Other 
Gies College of Business
Gies Kerzen GmbH, German candle manufacturer

References

Dutch-language surnames
German-language surnames
Patronymic surnames